Jaroslav Bohdan Antonovych Rudnyckyj
 (November 18, 1910 – October 19, 1995) was a Ukrainian Canadian linguist and lexicographer with a specialty in etymology and onomastics, folklorist, bibliographer, travel writer, and publicist. He was one of the pioneers of Slavic Studies in Canada and one of the founding fathers of Canadian "Multiculturalism". In scholarship, he is best known for his incomplete two volume Etymological Dictionary of the Ukrainian Language (1962–82), his Ukrainian-German Dictionary (1943), and his extensive study of the term and name "Ukraine" (1951).

Career 

Born in Przemyśl, Habsburg Galicia, in what is today eastern Poland near the border with Ukraine, he received his M.A. in Slavistics in 1934 and his PhD (under Witold Taszycki) in this same field in 1937 from the University of Lviv. From 1938 to 1940, he was Research Associate at the Ukrainian Scientific Institute in Berlin. From 1941 to 1945 he was a professor at the Ukrainian Free University in Prague and he taught at the University of Heidelberg from 1945 to 1948.

In 1949 he emigrated to Canada where he organized and became head of the Department of Slavic Studies at the University of Manitoba. He stayed there until his retirement in 1976. With the historian, Dmytro Doroshenko and the literary scholar, Leonid Biletsky, he was a co-founder of the Canadian branch of the Ukrainian Free Academy of Sciences which is located in Winnipeg. He became the third president (1955–1970) and one of the most important scholars in this emigre institution which carried out a wide-ranging publication program during his presidency. After his retirement from the University of Manitoba, he moved to Montreal in eastern Canada from which he frequently commuted to Ottawa to work in the National Archives of Canada and teach at the University of Ottawa.

Philologist 

His books include The Ukrainian Language and Its Dialects, in Ukrainian, (1937; 5th revised ed. 1978), a German-language textbook of Ukrainian (1940; 4th ed. 1964), A Modern Ukrainian Grammar for English speakers (1949; reprinted seven times), and a pioneering but incomplete English-language Etymological Dictionary of the Ukrainian Language (2 volumes in 22 fascicles, 1962–1982). He also produced several smaller Ukrainian language books on the origins of various Ukrainian placenames including Galicia, Volhynia, and, in most detail, Ukraine. As well, he wrote on Canadian, especially Manitoban, placenames of Ukrainian origin.

During the Second World War, he published a short Ukrainian-German Dictionary which quickly went through four editions: (1940; 1941; 1942; and 1943). Together with Zenon Kuzelia, he also published a much larger Ukrainian-German Dictionary (1943; reprinted 1983) which was a pioneering effort in its day. (It contained over 100,000 words.)

Travel writer 

During the Cold War era, Rudnyckyj published a series of books which chronicled his visits to various libraries and centres of Ukrainian cultural life and scholarship in the West. Among these his Ukrainian language books on his "Travels Across Half the World" (1955), "Travels Through America" (1956), and "Travels Through Canada" (1959?) are especially notable.

His reports on various North American libraries, including the American "Library of Congress", which contained substantial Slavic and Ukrainian holdings, are also worthy of mention. These reports formed a supplement to his annual bibliographic reports on the progress of Slavic and Ukrainian scholarship and literature in Canada which he published throughout the 1950s and 1960s.

Folklorist 

Rudnyckyj's work in Ukrainian dialect studies, etymology, and onomastics naturally led to interests in folklore, and during his Canadian period, he published numerous works on Ukrainian Canadian folklore. The source collection titled Ukrainian-Canadian Folklore and Dialectological Texts was published in Ukrainian in several volumes beginning in 1956. One volume even appeared in English translation.

Publicist 

Rudnyckyj was a prolific contributor to the Ukrainian-language press in North America, especially in Canada. In these shorter pieces, he popularized his various scholarly researches, informed the public about academic affairs, and wrote on his extensive travels across Canada and to various other countries.

On occasion, Rudnyckyj also approached more openly political topics, especially those connected with his professional interests as a linguist. Thus during the Cold War, he was very concerned about the fate of the Ukrainian language under Soviet rule, and, comparing its situation with that of other languages under political pressure, pioneered the concept of "linguicide".

After his retirement from the University of Manitoba and his move to Montreal, he became active in the emigre government of the Ukrainian People's Republic which had been forced from the territory of Ukraine in 1920 by its rival Soviet government. In 1992, after the emergence of an independent Ukraine, he took part in the transfer of the mandate of the Ukrainian People's Republic to the new Ukrainian state.

Canadiana 

From 1963 to 1971, Rudnyckyj was a member of the Canadian Royal Commission on Bilingualism and Biculturalism and with others promoted the idea of a multilingual Canada which recognized the importance of regional languages. His contribution to the Fourth Book of the Report of the Royal Commission, which dealt with the needs and contributions of "other ethnic groups" to Canadian society, was substantial and directly led to the promulgation of the new policy of "Multiculturalism" by the federal government of Canada, and thereafter, by several provinces as well.

In 1992, he was made an Officer of the Order of Canada.

Legacy 

Rudnyckyj's personal bibliography, was published in four parts beginning in 1975; in the last part published in 1995 under the title J.B. Rudnyckyj: Repertorium Bibliographicum Addenda 1984–1994, the list reaches a very impressive 2967 titles, although most of these are short pamphlets and newspaper articles. Among his numerous students, John Pauls (Sydoruk), Volodymyr Zhyla, Robert Klymasz, Forvyn Bohdan, and Stephen Holutiak-Hallick continued his work in onomastics and other fields.

Notes

References 

 Rudnyckyj's correspondence, including a few letters to three different Canadian Prime Ministers, comprises over 96 volumes and is stored in the National Archives of Canada, Ottawa. Some papers concerning his work on the Royal Commission on Bilingualism and Biculturalism are stored at Concordia University in Montreal. A significant amount of material on his academic and teaching career is held by the University of Manitoba Archives & Special Collections, including material transferred from the National Archives.
 Scripta Manent: A Biobibliography of J. B. Rudnyckyj (Winnipeg-Ottawa, 1975). This incomplete bibliography lists 1527 titles and contains an English language biographical sketch of Rudnyckyj by Olha Woycenko.
 Tania Nosko-Oboroniv, Yaroslav Bohdan Rudnytskyi (n.p., 1992?). A brief biographical sketch in Ukrainian.
 Thomas M. Prymak, "Inveterate Voyager: J.B. Rudnyckyj on Ukrainian Culture, Books, and Libraries in the West During the 'Long Cold War,'" Canadian Slavonic Papers, LI, 1 (March 2009), 53–76.
 Thomas M. Prymak, "Two Encyclopedias: The Difference a War Made," Ukrainski visti/Ukrainian News (Edmonton), April 16–29, 2009, p. 7. An English-language article analyzing the treatment of Ukrainian Canadians in the Canadian encyclopedias published in 1936 and 1958 and the critical role of Rudnyckyj in instigating some major changes which helped to eliminate the negative ethnic bias of the 1936 article.
 Thomas M.Prymak, "How the Ukrainians Helped Make Canada what it is Today," Ukrainian Weekly (New Jersey), no. 35, August 27, 2017, pp. 9 and 12. A brief outline of Rudnyckyj's contribution to the Royal Commission on Bilingualism and Biculturalism and its place in the forging of official multiculturalism in Canada. Published to commemorate the 150th anniversary of the Canadian confederation. Available on-line.
 Thomas M. Prymak, “J. B. Rudnyckyj and Canada.” https://www.slideshare.net/ThomasMPrymak/j-b-rudnyckyj-and-canada?qid=3d0b3213-3158-473a-855b-c2c82b34e242&v=&b=&from_search=1 
And also available at: https://www.academia.edu/38519781/J._B._Rudnyckyj_and_Canada.pdf   Very brief biographical portrait, which includes a discussion of Rudnyckyj's philological interests and concentrates upon his impressions of the unique character of the Ukrainian language spoken in Canada in the 1940s and the 1950s.
 Thomas M. Prymak, “The Royal Commission and Rudnyckyj’s Mission: The Forging of Official Multiculturalism in Canada, 1963-1971,” The University of Toronto Quarterly, LXXXVIII, 1 (2019), 43–63. Scholarly investigation of Jaroslav Rudnyckyj's participation in the Royal Commission on Bilingualism and Biculturalism, which gave rise to the federal policy of “Multiculturalism in a Bilingual Framework.” Also treats the question of possible links between the national question in Canada and the foreign policies of Prime Minister Pierre Trudeau.

External links 
 Archives of Jaroslav Rudnyckyj (Jaroslav Rudnyckyj fonds, R5366) are held at Library and Archives Canada

1910 births
1995 deaths
People from Przemyśl
People from the Kingdom of Galicia and Lodomeria
Linguists from Canada
Linguists from Ukraine
Etymologists
Officers of the Order of Canada
Writers from Winnipeg
Academic staff of the University of Manitoba
Ukrainian emigrants to Canada
Ukrainian Austro-Hungarians
University of Lviv alumni
Canadian folklorists
Ukrainian lexicographers
Heads of government of Ukraine in exile
20th-century linguists
20th-century lexicographers
Multiculturalism activists in Canada